Kvæði (Kvaedi; at kvøða: "to sing a tune or kvæði"; kvæði also means verse in Icelandic, also sometimes used to mean stanza) are the old ballads of the Faroe Islands, accompanied by the Faroese dance. 

Kvæði can have hundreds of stanzas plus a chorus sung between every verse.

History

It is generally thought that Faroese ballads, as elsewhere in Europe, began to be composed in the Middle Ages, but very little medieval Faroese writing survives, so the ballads' medieval history is obscure. The subject matter of Faroese ballads varies widely, including heroic narratives set in the distant past, contemporary politics, and comic tales. The most archaic-looking layer, however, is the heroic narratives. It was once thought that these derive independently from Viking-Age oral narratives, and this may be true of a few, but it has since been shown that most derive directly from written Icelandic sagas or occasionally rímur. The traceable origins of Faroese balladry, then, seem to lie between the fourteenth century (when the relevant Icelandic sagas tended to be composed) and the seventeenth (when contacts with Iceland diminished).

Faroese ballads began to be collected by Jens Christian Svabo in 1781–1782, though Svabo's collection was not published in his lifetime; the most prominent of Svabo's successors was Venceslaus Ulricus Hammershaimb. The Danish historians Svend Grundtvig and Jørgen Bloch began the process of a complete, standard edition of the ballads, which eventually gave rise to the Føroya kvæði/Corpus Carminum Færoensium, published between 1941 and 2003. In the last volume, Marianne Clausen presented a large collection of music transcriptions of kvæði melodies, based on sound recordings.

In the eighteenth to twentieth centuries, the period for which scholars have information about how kvæði were performed: 'the family-oriented kvoldseta, in which aurally memorized texts of family ballads were sung to pass the time, and the village dance, in which the memorized texts of the kvoldseta were performed by ballad owners who might add or delete stanzas in order to suit the mood of the dancers'.

Ballads took an important role in the development of Faroese national consciousness and the promotion of literacy in Faroes in the nineteenth and twentieth centuries.

Among the most famous of all kvæði is Ormurin langi written by Jens Christian Djurhuus and today played by the Faroese folk metal band Týr.

Example

References

External links
The digital edition of Føroya Kvæði/Corpus Carminum Færoensium at snar.fo
Heimskringla.no - Føroysk kvæði og vísur 
N. Kershaw, Stories and Ballads of the Far Past (Cambridge: Cambridge University Press, 1921), https://archive.org/details/storiesballadsof00chad, https://www.gutenberg.org/ebooks/33471.
Finnur Hansen's Faroese song page.
Fotatradk.com, kvæði (text) on the website of Fótatraðk, which is a Faroese Chain Dance Association in Copenhagen, the members are mainly Faroese students, who study in Copenhagen.

Faroese music
Faroese literature
Faroese folklore
Ballad collections